The Fruit Belt (Medical Park) is a residential neighborhood in Buffalo, New York. It is located adjacent to the Buffalo Niagara Medical Campus.

Geography 
The Fruit Belt is located within the East Side of Buffalo. The neighborhood is centered along High Street running west–east and Jefferson Avenue running north–south. It is enclosed along its eastern boundary by the Kensington Expressway and Michigan Avenue as its Western Boundary, separating the Fruit Belt from the Medical Campus.

History and culture 
At one time home to over 10,000 people, the Fruit Belt takes its name from the large number of orchards German immigrant settlers planted in the area. Holding true to their previously established agrarian nature, they planted large orchards and vegetable gardens in the area. As their numbers increased, in these orchards were laid out the present streets, the names themselves remaining as a testimony to the early nature of the neighborhood. The area remained a tight-knit neighborhood until the 1950s. Without regard for the residents, construction of the Kensington Expressway severed the neighborhood in half destroying a harmony which had existed for over one hundred years.

After the destruction caused by the Kensington Expressway and decades of disinvestment by the City of Buffalo, the neighborhood rapidly declined. In recent years, due to rebranding as Medical Park and encouragement from Buffalo for the construction of medical campuses in the neighborhood, there has been much investment. But that influx of money and development has been focused on the demolition of older houses dating as far back as the 1800s for brand new medical buildings to employ surrounding residents. Tenant and homeowners in the neighborhood have become increasingly active as pressures to reinvigorate the neighborhood have increased. Statistics of Medical Park

Education 
Marva J. Daniel Futures Preparatory School (formerly Futures Academy) is located in the Fruit Belt.

See also
Neighborhoods of Buffalo, New York

References 

Neighborhoods in Buffalo, New York